Kang Jin-kyu (born 10 September 1983) is a South Korean football midfielder, who plays for Busan Transportation Corporation FC in Korea National League. His previous club was Chunnam Dragons and Gwangju Sangmu in K-League.

Career statistics

References
Korean FA Cup match result

External links 
 
 

1983 births
Living people
Association football midfielders
South Korean footballers
Jeonnam Dragons players
Gimcheon Sangmu FC players
K League 1 players
Korea National League players
Chung-Ang University alumni